John J. Sherman (born April 12, 1955) is an American businessman. He is the majority owner of the Kansas City Royals of Major League Baseball (MLB).

John Sherman is the founder and past chairman and CEO of Inergy, L.P.

Biography
Sherman graduated from Ottawa University. He founded LPG Services Group, which later merged with Dynegy. In 1996, Sherman founded Inergy. It merged with Crestwood Holdings in 2013.

Sherman bought a minority share of the Cleveland Indians in 2016, and became their vice chairman.

On August 30, 2019, Kansas City Royals owner David Glass announced his intention to sell the franchise to Sherman at a reported price of over $1 billion. MLB and its owners approved the purchase on November 21.

References

Living people
American expatriates in Canada
American energy industry businesspeople
Baseball people from Missouri
Businesspeople from Missouri
Cleveland Indians owners
Kansas City Royals owners
Ottawa University alumni
People from Kansas City, Missouri
1955 births